Alloclemensia mesospilella is a moth of the  family Incurvariidae. It is found from Fennoscandia and northern Russia to the Pyrenees, Italy, and Romania.

The wingspan is 12–15 mm.

The larvae feed on Ribes alpinum, Ribes uva-crispa and Saxifraga rotundifolia. They mine the leaves of their host plant.

External links
Swedish Moths
bladmineerders.nl

Incurvariidae
Moths of Europe
Moths described in 1854